Aemilianus can refer to a number of people in Classical history:

Scipio Aemilianus (185 BC–129 BC), son of Lucius Aemilius Paulus Macedonicus, was adopted by Publius Cornelius Scipio, the son of Scipio Africanus
Lucius Mussius Aemilianus, one of the Thirty Tyrants; supported the rebellion of the Macriani against Gallienus (260-261 AD), and afterwards probably proclaimed himself emperor
Saint Aemilianus (died 484) (also called Aemilius), martyred in Africa
Émilien of Nantes (Latin: Aemilianus) (died c. 725), Bishop of Nantes who fought the Saracens